Abell 70 is a planetary nebula located 13,500-17,500 light years away in the constellation of Aquila. It is approaching the earth at 79 kilometers per second and expanding 38 kilometers per second. There is a galaxy named PMN J2033-0656 behind Abell 70, giving it a "diamond ring" effect.

Composition
The faint OIII ring structure can be seen through a telescope. The central star of Abell 70 is a binary star system consisting of a hot white dwarf and a G-type subgiant star. The subgiant star is a barium star that rotates rapidly (with a period of about 2 days) and is variable due to starspots.

Background galaxy

PMN J2033-0656 is an edge-on radio galaxy. Its position gives Abell 70 a diamond ring effect at its northern edge.

See also
 Abell 7
 Abell 31
 Abell 36
 Abell 78

References

External links
 

Abell 70
70
Aquila (constellation)
Radio galaxies